Epiblema junctana is a species of moth of the family Tortricidae. It is found in Sweden, Denmark, Germany, Austria, the Czech Republic, Slovakia, Poland, Bulgaria, Romania, Hungary, Ukraine, the Near East, Russia, Kazakhstan, Iran, Central Asia and China (Henan).

The wingspan is 11–18 mm. Adults are on wing from May to July in western Europe.

The larvae feed on Inula salicina.

References

Moths described in 1856
Eucosmini